Pomyków  is a village in the administrative district of Gmina Moszczenica, within Piotrków County, Łódź Voivodeship, in central Poland.

References

Villages in Piotrków County